Thaba Mokhele is a community council located in the Mohale's Hoek District of Lesotho. Its population in 2006 was 18,135.

Villages
The community of Thaba-Mokhele includes the villages of: 
 
 Boikhutsong
 Five Rand
 Ha 'Mako
 Ha Belemane
 Ha Biane
 Ha Bokoro
 Ha Chefa
 Ha Faetoa
 Ha Jimi
 Ha Kaphe (Maholong)
 Ha Kaphe (Moreneng)
 Ha Khanyane
 Ha Khoale
 Ha Kholoane
 Ha Kooko
 Ha Lisene
 Ha Mabaka
 Ha Mahlelebe
 Ha Mahooana (Mahahaneng)
 Ha Mako (Ha Folatsane)
 Ha Mako (Mahlalela)
 Ha Mapuru
 Ha Maqeba
 Ha Maqoala
 Ha Masita
 Ha Matseo
 Ha Moeletsi
 Ha Mohale
 Ha Mokhothu
 Ha Mokunyane
 Ha Moloche
 Ha Monakalali
 Ha Moshabe
 Ha Mosika
 Ha Mosotho
 Ha Mothe
 Ha Mothetho
 Ha Ntepe
 Ha Ntsapi
 Ha Pekenene
 Ha Phala
 Ha Pitseng
 Ha Qoane
 Ha Rakhenku
 Ha Ralepei
 Ha Ramahloli
 Ha Ramahlolonyane
 Ha Ramatlali
 Ha Ramokongoane
 Ha Rampeli
 Ha Rantšoeu
 Ha Ranyakane
 Ha Rasebolelo
 Ha Rathobeli
 Ha Ratšoeu
 Ha Seabata
 Ha Sehloho
 Ha Sekunyane
 Ha Sepinare (Moreneng)
 Ha Sepinare (Sekiring)
 Ha Soere
 Ha Taele
 Ha Tepa
 Ha Thetela
 Ha Thokoa
 Ha Tšese
 Hloahloeng
 Hohobeng
 Kalakeng
 Khang-ka-Khotso
 Kholokoe
 Kolobere
 Kopialena
 Lefikeng
 Lefikeng (Thaba-Tšoeu)
 Lekhalong
 Letlapeng
 Lifateng (Ha Nkunyane)
 Lifateng (Lekhalong)
 Lifateng (Moreneng)
 Lifateng (Motse-Mocha)
 Lifateng (Thoteng)
 Lifateng (Tšoeneng)
 Linokong
 Liphofung (Ha Ralijeng)
 Lithabaneng (Boithatelo)
 Lithakaling
 Maboneng
 Makhaloaneng
 Makutoaneng
 Maqoala
 Matsatseng
 Matsaung
 Matsekeng
 Matsoapong
 Motsekong
 Nk'hunk'hu
 Nkoboto
 Noka-Ntšo
 Nomoroane
 Ntširele
 Patisa
 Phahameng
 Phohlokong
 Pontšeng
 Sehlabaneng
 Senekane
 Terai Hoek (Ha Molomo)
 Thabana- Ntšonyana
 Thabaneng-tsa-Marole
 Thoteng and Tutululung

References

External links
 Google map of community villages

Populated places in Mohale's Hoek District